Helmert Bank is a submarine bank in the Weddell Sea named for the German geodesist Friedrich Robert Helmert. The name was proposed by Dr. Heinrich Hinze of the Alfred Wegener Institute for Polar and Marine Research, Bremerhaven, Germany, and was approved by the Advisory Committee for Undersea Features in June 1997.

References

Undersea banks of the Southern Ocean